Metroid (1986) is a video game.

Metroid may also refer to:
 Metroid (fictional species), a fictional alien predator species introduced in the 1986 game
 Metroid series, a series of video games that was started with the 1986 game